Helmut Coing (28 February 1912 – 15 August 2000) was a German legal historian. His work focused on the history of European private law, especially in the Middle Ages, legal history in Germany and the philosophy of law.

Life and career 
Helmut Coing came from a Huguenot family of civil servants. After graduating from the Ratsgymnasium in Hanover, he studied law at the Universities of Kiel, Munich, Göttingen and Lille. In 1935 he received his Dr. jur. promoviert. He then moved to the University of Frankfurt am Main, where he habilitated in 1938 with Erich Genzmer. In August 1939, reserve officer Coing was drafted into the German Wehrmacht. Most recently he was a reserve captain and divisional adjutant. In 1941 Coing became professor of Roman and Civil law at the University of Frankfurt am Main. He remained unaffected during the National Socialist period and after his return from captivity in 1948 he was appointed professor of civil and Roman law at the re-established University of Frankfurt am Main. For a time, Coing also taught philosophy of law.

As rector of the University of Frankfurt am Main for the academic years 1955/56 and 1956/57, Coing took on organizational and operational tasks in the scientific community for the first time and became chairman of the West German Rectors' Conference in 1956–1957 and, after his replacement as university rector, chairman of the Science Council (1958–1960).. In 1964 Coing was the founding director of the Max Planck Institute for European Legal History and remained its director until his retirement in February 1980. In 1968 he was elected a corresponding member of the Academy of Sciences in Göttingen  and the Bavarian Academy of Sciences. In 1972 he became a corresponding fellow of the British Academy.  From 1970 to 1973 he was chairman of the humanities section of the Max Planck Society and from 1970 to 1972 he was also head of the Statutes Commission and finally 1978 to 1984 Vice President of the Max Planck Society. In 1984 Coing, who had already been inducted into the Pour le Mérite for Sciences and Arts in 1973, was elected Chancellor of the Order. He held this post until 1992.

Awards and legacy 
In 1958 Coing was awarded the Goethe Plaque by the city of Frankfurt am Main. In 1966 he became an Officer of the French Legion of Honour. In 1973 he became a member of the Order Pour le Mérite for Science and the Arts. A year later he was awarded the Great Cross of Merit with Star of the Federal Republic of Germany. In 1990 he received the Commander's Cross of the Order of Merit of the Republic of Italy and in the same year the Great Federal Cross of Merit with Star and Ribbon and the Hessian Order of Merit. He was awarded honorary doctorates awarded by the Universities of Lyon (1959), Montpellier (1959), Vienna (1965), Aberdeen (1968), Brussels (1975) and Uppsala (1977).

In 2008, the Max Planck Institute for European Legal History in Frankfurt am Main awarded the Helmut Coing Prize for the first time. The award is intended to give young researchers the opportunity to work at the institute for 4 to 5 months to complete a dissertation or post-doctoral thesis that deals with an area of European legal history. The scholarship is advertised worldwide every three years.

A path on the Westend campus was named after him.

References 

 Die Sechshundertjahrfeier der Universität Wien. Offizieller Festbericht
 Helmut Coing – Lebensbericht eines Rechtsgelehrten

1912 births
2000 deaths
20th-century German historians
Legal historians
Corresponding Fellows of the British Academy
Officiers of the Légion d'honneur
Recipients of the Pour le Mérite (civil class)
Member of the Mont Pelerin Society
Max Planck Institute directors